Sanco can mean:

Mie Kotsu Co., Ltd., also known as Sanco, a Japanese public transportation company 
DG-SANCO, a European Union organisation, now Directorate-General for Health and Food Safety
South African National Civics Organisation (SANCO)
Sanco, Texas, Coke County, Texas, U.S.
Sancho Creek, formerly Sanco Creek, West Virginia, U.S.